The 1983 Monte Carlo Open (also known as the Jacomo Monte Carlo Open for sponsorship reasons) was a men's tennis tournament played on outdoor clay courts at the Monte Carlo Country Club in Roquebrune-Cap-Martin, France that was part of the 1983 Volvo Grand Prix. The tournament was held from 28 March through 3 April 1983. Fifth-seeded Mats Wilander won the singles title.

Finals

Singles
 Mats Wilander defeated  Mel Purcell, 6–1, 6–2, 6–3
 It was Wilander's 1st singles title of the year and the 5th of his career.

Doubles
 Heinz Günthardt /  Balázs Taróczy defeated  Henri Leconte /  Yannick Noah, 6–2, 6–4

References

External links
 
 ATP tournament profile
 ITF tournament edition details

Monte Carlo Open
Monte-Carlo Masters
1983 in Monégasque sport
Monte